The World Is Not Enough is a 1999 James Bond film.

The World Is Not Enough may also refer to:

Arts and entertainment
 The World Is Not Enough (soundtrack), the film's soundtrack
 "The World Is Not Enough" (song), the film's theme song
 The World Is Not Enough (Nintendo 64), a video game adaptation of the film that was released for the Nintendo 64 in 2000
 The World Is Not Enough (PlayStation), a video game adaptation of the film that was released for the PlayStation in 2000
 The World Is Not Enough (2001 video game), a video game adaptation of the film that was released for the Game Boy Color in 2001
 The World Is Not Enough (novel), a novelization of the film
 The World Is Not Enough, a 1946 novel by Zoé Oldenbourg

Other uses
 World Is Not Enough (spacecraft propulsion), a refuelable spacecraft propulsion concept that works on water steam

See also
 Orbis non sufficit, a quotation from the Satires, later used as a motto by Philip II of Spain

cs:Jeden svět nestačí
da:The World Is Not Enough
de:Die Welt ist nicht genug
es:The World Is Not Enough
fr:Le monde ne suffit pas
hr:Svijet nije dovoljan
id:The World Is Not Enough
nl:The World Is Not Enough
ja:007 ワールド・イズ・ノット・イナフ
no:The World Is Not Enough
pl:Świat to za mało
pt:The World Is Not Enough
ru:И целого мира мало (фильм)
sr:Свет није довољан
fi:Kun maailma ei riitä
zh:新鐵金剛之黑日危機